AMD XGP (eXternal Graphics Platform) is brand for an external graphics solution for laptops and notebooks by AMD. The technology was announced on June 4, 2008 on Computex 08 trade show, following the announcement of the codenamed Puma notebook platform.

Development
Originally reported by Hexus.net as a side project to the R600 series graphics cards. Codenamed Lasso, the project is an external graphics solution using desktop video cards, and data is sent via two cables as defined in PCI-E external cabling specification (version 1.0). The project would later fall into development hell with unknown development status. In June 2008, near Computex 2008, rumours surfaced over the Internet about AMD is preparing an external graphics solution for notebook computers, but using a proprietary connectivity solution instead. The ATI XGP was officially announced on June 4, 2008 during the course of the Computex 2008 exhibition.

Technology
The XGP platform consists of several parts, that includes a mobility Radeon HD graphics card, an external case and a proprietary connectivity solution.

Graphics
 Single GPU configuration
 Mobility Radeon HD 3870 (M88 core)
 AVIVO HD with UVD
 Integrated HDCP
 Mobility Radeon HD 5870 (Broadway core)
 ATI CrossFire X technology (Dual GPU configuration)
 Mobility Radeon HD 3850 X2
 Mobility Radeon HD 3870 X2

Connectivity

Data
 Proprietary connectivity solution designed in collaboration with JAE Electronics
 Transfer PCI-E 2.0 signals between XGP and the notebook computer
 PCI Express 2.0 compliant
 8 lanes and 16 lanes option available
 Hot plug detection
 AMD has one year exclusivity on the use of the connector 
 2 USB 2.0
 For connecting external disc players
 Connected via the signal pairs between the southbridge to the USB hub via the cable

Visual
 Supports up to four displays via the following visual outputs:
 DVI-I
 HDMI
 Optional DisplayPort

Consumer products

Laptop
 Fujitsu-Siemens Amilo Sa 3650 
 Acer Ferrari One 200

Enclosure/dock
 Fujitsu-Siemens AMILO GraphicBooster
 Acer DynaVivid

References

External links
 xgp_technology_brief.pdf
 Maximum PC
 Acer: AMD's XGP External Technology No Good

ATI Technologies products
AMD technologies
Graphics cards